Massachusetts House of Representatives' 1st Essex district in the United States is one of 160 legislative districts included in the lower house of the Massachusetts General Court. It covers part of Essex County. Republican James Kelcourse of Amesbury served the district from 2015-2022. Following Kelcourse's resignation in late-June 2022, the seat remained vacant until the election of Democrat Dawne Shand of Newburyport. Rep. Shand took office on January 4, 2023. 

Following redistricting efforts in 2021, the 1st Essex shifted slightly west. The district now includes the towns of Merrimac and Salisbury; the city of Newburyport; and part of the city of Amesbury. Previously, the 1st Essex District included all of the city of Amesbury.

Towns represented
The district includes the following localities:
 Amesbury 
 Merrimac
 Newburyport 
 Salisbury 

The current district geographic boundary overlaps with those of the Massachusetts Senate's 1st Essex and Middlesex and 2nd Essex and Middlesex districts.

Former locales

The district previously covered the following:
 Gloucester, circa 1974 	
 Rockport, circa 1974 
 West Newbury, circa 1872

Representatives

 Winthrop O. Evans, circa 1859 
 Elbridge M. Morse, circa 1859 
 Charles Goss, circa 1888 
 John C. Risteen, circa 1888 
 George L. Briggs, circa 1920 
 Henry M. Duggan, circa 1951

See also
 List of Massachusetts House of Representatives elections
 Other Essex County districts of the Massachusetts House of Representatives: 2nd, 3rd, 4th, 5th, 6th, 7th, 8th, 9th, 10th, 11th, 12th, 13th, 14th, 15th, 16th, 17th, 18th
 Essex County districts of the Massachusett Senate: 1st, 2nd, 3rd; 1st Essex and Middlesex; 2nd Essex and Middlesex
 List of Massachusetts General Courts
 List of former districts of the Massachusetts House of Representatives

Images

References

External links
 Ballotpedia
  (State House district information based on U.S. Census Bureau's American Community Survey).

House
Government of Essex County, Massachusetts